Lionel Lindon, ASC (September 2, 1905 – September 20, 1971) was an American film cameraman and cinematographer who spent much of his career working for Paramount.

In 1950, he went freelance and began to work in television as well as film, continuing to work until the year of his death. He was three times nominated for an Academy Award for Best Cinematography and in 1956 was the winner of the award for color for Around the World in 80 Days.

Life
Lionel—son of film editor Verna Willis and nephew to Set Director, Edwin B. Willis, —was a native of San Francisco. Soon after leaving school, Lindon got a job as a general assistant at Paramount Pictures and joined the camera department. Through the Roaring Twenties, he worked as a camera assistant and as a "foreign negative cameraman", in 1930 becoming a cameraman. In 1943, he made his debut as a director of photography and went on to serve in that capacity in some 66 American films, including Westerns. In 1950 he went freelance, which did not prevent him from working for Paramount on occasions. His final three films appeared in 1969.

The major names he worked with include John Frankenheimer, Frank Sinatra, Laurence Harvey, Edward Ludwig, Arlene Dahl, George Marshall, Alan Ladd, Veronica Lake, and Dorothy Lamour. Lindon received three Oscar nominations for best cinematographer, one of which led to the award. Lindon also worked in television between 1953 and 1971, contributing to 39 television series, including Alfred Hitchcock Presents, and eight TV movies.

He died in the Los Angeles suburb of Van Nuys on September 20, 1971.

Filmography

Cinema

1943: Let's Face It!, Sidney Lanfield
1944: Going My Way, Leo McCarey
1945: Masquerade in Mexico, Mitchell Leisen
1945: Ed Gardner's Duffy's Tavern, Hal Walker
1945: A Medal for Benny, Irving Pichel
1946: The Blue Dahlia, George Marshall
1946: Road to Utopia, Hal Walker
1946: O.S.S., Irving Pichel
1946: Monsieur Beaucaire, George Marshall
1947: My Favorite Brunette, Elliott Nugent
1947: Welcome Stranger, Elliott Nugent
1947: Variety Girl, George Marshall
1947: The Trouble with Women, Sidney Lanfield 
1948: The Sainted Sisters, William D. Russell
1948: Tap Roots, George Marshall
1948: Isn't It Romantic?, Norman Z. McLeod
1949: Alias Nick Beal, John Farrow
1950: Destination Moon, Irving Pichel
1950: Quicksand, Irving Pichel
1950: The Great Rupert, Irving Pichel
1950: The Sun Sets at Dawn, Paul Sloane
1950: Prehistoric Women, Gregg C. Tallas
1951: Only the Valiant, Gordon Douglas
1951: Submarine Command, John Farrow
1951: Rhubarb, Arthur Lubin
1951: Drums in the Deep South, William Cameron Menzies
1952: The Turning Point, William Dieterle
1952: Japanese War Bride, King Vidor
1952: Caribbean Gold, also called Caribbean, Edward Ludwig
1952: The Blazing Forest, Edward Ludwig 
1953: The Vanquished, Edward Ludwig
1953: Tropic Zone, Lewis R. Foster
1953: Jamaica Run, Lewis R. Foster
1953: The Stars Are Singing, Norman Taurog
1953: Sangaree, Edward Ludwig
1954: Secret of the Incas, Jerry Hopper
1954: Casanova's Big Night, Norman Z. McLeod
1954: Jivaro, Edward Ludwig
1955: Lucy Gallant, Robert Parrish
1955: Conquest of Space, Byron Haskin
1956: Around the World in 80 Days, Michael Anderson
1956: The Scarlet Hour, Michael Curtiz
1957: The Lonely Man, Henry Levin
1957: The Black Scorpion, Edward Ludwig
1958: I Want to Live!, Robert Wise
1959: Alias Jesse James, Norman Z. McLeod
1961: The Young Savages, John Frankenheimer
1961: Too Late Blues, John Cassavetes
1962: All Fall Down, John Frankenheimer
1962: The Manchurian Candidate, John Frankenheimer
1966: The Trouble with Angels, Ida Lupino
1966: Boy, Did I Get a Wrong Number!, George Marshall
1966: Grand Prix, John Frankenheimer
1966: Dead Heat on a Merry-Go-Round, Bernard Girard
1969: The Extraordinary Seaman, John Frankenheimer
1969: Pendulum, George Schaefer

Television movies
1964: See How They Run, David Lowell Rich
1967: The Meanest Men in the West, Charles S. Dubin and Samuel Fuller
1970: The Movie Murderer, Boris Sagal
1970: Ritual of Evil, Robert Day
1971: Do You Take This Stranger?, Richard T. Heffron
1971: Vanished, Buzz Kulik

Nominations and awards 
Academy Award for Best Cinematography :
1944, black and white, for Going My Way (nominated)
1956, color, for Around the World in 80 Days (winner)
1958, black and white, for I Want to Live! (nominated)

Notes

External links 

1905 births
1971 deaths
American cinematographers
People from San Francisco
Best Cinematographer Academy Award winners